In American football, a handoff is the act of handing the ball directly from one player to another, i. e. without it leaving the first player's hands. Most rushing plays on offense begin with a handoff from the quarterback to another running back. The biggest risk with any hand-off is the chance of fumble on the exchange. A hand-off can occur in any direction. A handoff does not count towards a teams points if the running back does not get sturdy in the end zone after the handoff. Sometimes called a "switch" in touch football. Alternately spelled without the hyphen; i.e., "handoff".

References

American football terminology